Sonic Dream Collective were a Swedish pop band from the city of Uppsala. 

They had their breakthrough with the 1995 single “Don't Go Breaking My Heart” which reached #5 on Billboards Hot Dance Breakouts Club Play top 5 list in US in 1997. 
Shortly after the release of the song "Don't Go Brekaing My Heart", the h version of the song called "Nie jestem zła" was created. That version is  performed by Magdalena Sokołowska, who used her name as a stage pseudonym in the 1990s. This singer created songs on the borderline of eurodance and Polish dance music known as disco polo.

The group achieved greatest success with their third single “Oh, Baby All” which peaked at #2 in Sweden. It also topped the Swedish national radio P3 Tracks chart. The debut album “Gravity” was also released the same year (1997 in the US).

Members of the band were singer-songwriter Linn Engström, songwriter Jon Hällgren and producer Anders Wågberg.

Between 1994 and 1997 the band had their own record label Flying Duck Music together with producer Stefan Warnberg.

A close collaboration was soon established with Giovanni Sconfienza and the record label Remixed Records where the second and final album “Dustproof” was released in 1998. By then the name had been shortened to Sonic Dream.

"Dustproof" also featured a collaboration with American guitarist Raven Storm, who was recording his album at the Flying Duck studios.  Hearing Storm's playing, Wågberg decided to add a rock element to their music.  Storm recorded several guitar solos and rhythm guitar parts, but most of it, including all of the solos, were left out of the final cut due to the producers' reluctance to change the musical formula.  Storm is featured most prominently on the song "Colors of the Wind."

Their song "Love" is used in one of the Dancemania soundtracks and on Dance Dance Revolution 2nd ReMIX.

Songs 
Take Me Back (1994)
Don't Go Breaking My Heart (1995)
Oh, Baby All (1995)
I Wonder Why (1995)
Happy Tune (1996)
Dig Deepe (1997)
Love (1997)
Heaven Knows (1998)
Pray (1998)
Taking Five (1999)

References

External links 

Sonic Dream Discography
Remixed Records
Swedish National Radio Tracks hits 1995 - Artists top 100 (in Swedish)

Musical groups from Uppsala